ABLE is an American retailer of women's clothing and accessories. The company was founded as a nonprofit organization in 2010 by Barrett Ward and Rachel Ward to facilitate women in Addis Ababa, Ethiopia, in leaving the commercial sex industry. Then it converted into a for-profit company and is classified as a benefit corporation. 

The company is headquartered in Nashville, Tennessee.

Barrett Ward is currently the CEO.

History
The concept for ABLE began in 2008 while Barrett Ward and his wife, Rachel, were living in Ethiopia. At the time Ward worked with Mocha Club, a nonprofit organization he co-founded in 2005. While at Mocha, he communicated with Women at Risk (WAR) and learned that women who might otherwise resort to prostitution due to lack of opportunity could be trained to weave scarves and sell them for a profit. Ward co-founded Ellilta, an Ethiopian scarf production company to provide jobs for the women at WAR. Ellilta was the first product manufacturing supplier for ABLE, which launched in October 2010.

Minka Kelly brought ABLE scarves with her on The Tonight Show Starring Jimmy Fallon in October 2013. On October 22, 2014, Barrett Ward was honored by GQ magazine at its 7th annual Gentlemen's Ball for his philanthropic efforts with ABLE.

In 2019, the company was presented in the Nashville Fashion Week.

References

External links
 Official website

Companies based in Tennessee